Hakan Kiper (born August 4, 1973) is a Turkish former swimmer, who specialized in breaststroke events. During his sporting career, he held numerous Turkish championship titles and meet records, and played for Galatasaray Spor Kulübü. Kiper also represented Turkey, as a 27-year-old, at the 2000 Summer Olympics, where he served as the captain of the national swimming team.

Kiper competed only in the men's 100 m breaststroke at the 2000 Summer Olympics in Sydney. He achieved a FINA B-cut of 1:05.29 from the Speedo Turkish Open Championships in Istanbul. He challenged seven other swimmers in heat three, including three-time Olympian Jorg Lindemeier of Namibia. He rounded out the field to last place in 1:07.46, a 3.34-second deficit from leader Vadim Tatarov of Moldova. Kiper failed to advance into the semifinals, as he placed sixtieth overall on the first day of prelims.

References

External links
Profile – Galatasaray Swimming 

1973 births
Living people
Turkish male backstroke swimmers
Olympic swimmers of Turkey
Swimmers at the 2000 Summer Olympics
Turkish male breaststroke swimmers
Galatasaray Swimming swimmers
20th-century Turkish people
21st-century Turkish people